Gao Hongying (born 24 December 1970) is a Chinese cyclist. She competed in the women's cross-country mountain biking event at the 1996 Summer Olympics.

References

External links
 

1970 births
Living people
Chinese female cyclists
Olympic cyclists of China
Cyclists at the 1996 Summer Olympics
Place of birth missing (living people)
20th-century Chinese women
21st-century Chinese women